This is a list of members of the Victorian Legislative Council, as appointed to the inaugural Council of 1851 or elected at the 1851 election.

From 1851 to 1856 the original Legislative Council was unicameral (a single chamber) and consisted of Electoral districts.
From 1856 onwards, the Victorian parliament consisted of two houses, the Victorian Legislative Council (upper house, consisting of Provinces) and the Victorian Legislative Assembly (lower house).

 Redmond Barry resigned June 1852, replaced as Solicitor-General from 13 April 1852 by Edward Williams. Williams was replaced by James Croke from 21 July 1852.
 Dight died 9 October 1852, replaced by William Nicholson, by-election November 1852
 Dunlop died 21 June 1852, replaced by Joseph Anderson on 14 July 1852
 Ebden resigned October 1852, replaced by Hugh Childers, from 26 October 1852.
 Griffith resigned June 1852, replaced by John Riddell on 21 June 1852
 Haines resigned August 1852, replaced by Archibald Michie on 26 October 1852
 Johnston resigned December 1852; replaced by Augustus Greeves, by-election January 1853
 Mercer resigned December 1852; replaced by John Myles, by-election December 1852
 Osborne resigned December 1852; replaced by Lauchlan Mackinnon, by-election December 1852
 Robinson died 14 May 1852; replaced by Alexander Thomson, by-election June 1852
 Ross resigned July 1852, replaced by Thomas Turner à Beckett, nominee, from 14 July 1852

References

Members of the Parliament of Victoria by term
19th-century Australian politicians